American Family Physician (AFP) is the editorially independent, peer-reviewed and evidence-based medical journal published by the American Academy of Family Physicians. Published continuously since 1950, each issue delivers concise, easy-to-read clinical review articles for physicians and other health care professionals.

The journal is published monthly in print, online, and app formats. It is mailed to an audience of more than 180,000 family medicine and other primary care physicians and health care professionals and viewed online by more than 2.5 million unique visitors monthly.

The predecessor to American Family Physician was the journal GP, an acronym for "General Practitioner". GP was first published in 1950 by the American Academy of General Practice, which was the predecessor organization to the American Academy of Family Physicians.

See also
JAMA
The New England Journal of Medicine
The BMJ
Annals of Internal Medicine
Canadian Family Physician

References

External links

Publications established in 1969
Family medicine journals
American Academy of Family Physicians
Biweekly journals
English-language journals